Vsevolod Konstantinovich Blinkov (born December 10, 1918 in Novonikolayevsk; died September 30, 1987 in Moscow) was a Soviet football player and manager and a bandy player.

Honours
 Soviet Top League winner: 1940, 1945, 1949
 Soviet Cup runner-up: 1945, 1949
 Top 33 players year-end list: 1948
 Bandy Soviet champion: 1951, 1952, Bandy Soviet championship runner-up: 1954
 Soviet Bandy cup winner: 1941, 1947, 1949, 1950, 1951, 1952, 1953, 1954

External links
  Profile

1918 births
1987 deaths
Burials at Vagankovo Cemetery
Soviet footballers
Soviet football managers
FC Dynamo Moscow players
Soviet bandy players
Soviet Top League players
Soviet First League players
FC Dynamo Moscow managers
PFC Krylia Sovetov Samara managers
FC Zorya Luhansk managers
Association football midfielders
Sportspeople from Novosibirsk